The surname Botes was first found in Prussia according to houseofnames

Another variant Botez This surname occurs predominantly in Europe according to forebears

Some South African sport men and women with the surname : 
Annelie Botes (born 1957), South African writer
Desvonde Botes (born 1974), South African golfer
Eugene Botes (born 1980), South African swimmer
Henrico Botes (born 1979), Namibian football striker
Jacques Botes (born 1980), South African rugby union player
Lu-Wayne Botes (born 1983), Namibian rugby union centre 
Quinton-Steele Botes (1960–2014), Namibian sport consultant
Tobie Botes (born 1984), South African rugby union player